Selvin Efraín Laínez Sevilla (born 1983) is a Honduran politician. He currently serves as deputy of the National Congress of Honduras representing the Liberal Party of Honduras for Yoro.

References

1983 births
Living people
People from Yoro Department
Deputies of the National Congress of Honduras
Liberal Party of Honduras politicians
Date of birth missing (living people)